Mark Heitman Almli (June 7, 1908 – June  11, 1967) was a minor league baseball player and collegiate American football, basketball and baseball coach. He served as the head men's basketball coach at St. Olaf College in Northfield, Minnesota from 1942 to 1957. He also served as the school's head football and baseball coach, with the St. Olaf's home baseball field being named in his honor.

References

External links
 

1908 births
1967 deaths
Baseball catchers
Baseball second basemen
St. Olaf Oles football coaches
Superior Blues players
Baseball players from Minnesota